Vanadyl isopropoxide is the metal alkoxide with the formula VO(O-iPr)3 (iPr = CH(CH3)2). A yellow volatile liquid, it is a common alkoxide of vanadium. It is used as a reagent and as a precursor to vanadium oxides.  The compound is diamagnetic. It is prepared by alcoholysis of vanadyl trichloride:
VOCl3 +  3 HOCH(CH3)2   →    VO(OCH(CH3)2)3  +  3 HCl
The related cyclopentanoxide VO(O-CH(CH2)4)3 is a dimer, one pair of alkoxide ligands bind weakly trans to the vanadyl oxygens.

References

Vanadium(V) compounds
Alkoxides
Vanadyl compounds